Šics (feminine: Šica) is a Latvian surname of German origin (from German surname Schütz). Individuals with the surname include:
Andris Šics (born 1985), Latvian luger
Guntis Sics, Australian sound engineer
Juris Šics (born 1983), Latvian luger, brother of Andris

Latvian-language masculine surnames
Surnames of German origin